IAFF may refer to:

 International Association of Fire Fighters, a labor union representing professional firefighters in the United States and Canada
 International Arts and Film Foundation, an American nonprofit foundation with an emphasis on children interested in performing and visual arts including film production